Palaestina may refer to:

 Syria Palaestina, a province of the Roman Empire (AD 135–390) following the merger of Judaea with Syria
 Palaestina Prima, a province of the Roman Empire (390–c. 636) comprising Galilee and the northern Jordan Valley
 Palaestina Secunda, a province of the Roman Empire (390–c. 636) comprising the shoreline and hills of the southern Levant
 Palaestina Salutaris, alias Palestina Tertia, a province of the Roman Empire (390–c. 636), comprising the Negev and Transjordan
Palaestina (spider), a genus of ant spiders

See also
Palestina (disambiguation)
Palestine (disambiguation)